The following is a list of notable events and releases of the year 2014 in Norwegian music.

Events

January
 9 –  The 13th All Ears festival started in Oslo (January 9 – 12).
 16 – Ice Music Festival 2014 started in Geilo (January 16–19).
 22 – Bodø Jazz Open started in Bodø (January 22–26).
 24
 Nordlysfestivalen started in Tromsø (January 24 – February 2).
 Anne-Lise Sollied Allemano (soprano) was awarded the Nordlysprisen 2014 at Nordlysfestivalen.
 30 –  Kristiansund Opera Festival opened (January 30 – February 15).

February
 5 – The Polarjazz Festival 2014 started in Longyearbyen (February 5 – 9).

March
 14 – Narvik Winter Festival started (March 14 – 23).

April
 3 – Tape to Zero started at Victoria, National jazz scene in Oslo, Norway (April 3 – 4).
 11 – Vossajazz started at Voss (April 11–13).
 12
 Sigbjørn Apeland was awarded Vossajazzprisen 2014.
 Mats Eilertsen performed the commissioned work Rubicon for Vossajazz 2014.
 16 – Inferno Metal Festival 2014 started in Oslo (April 16–19).
 23 – SoddJazz 2014 started in Inderøy, Nord-Trøndelag (April 23–27).

May
 6 – Norway participated at the Eurovision Song Contest (May 6 – 10).
 21 – The Festspillene i Bergen started (May 21 – June 4).
 22 – Nattjazz started in Bergen (May 22 – 31)

June
 10 – Norwegian Wood 2014 started in Oslo, Norway (June 10–14).
 11 – Bergenfest started in Bergen, Norway (June 11–15).
 21 – Festspillene i Nord-Norge started in Harstad, Norway (June 21–28).

July
 2 – Kongsberg Jazzfestival started at Kongsberg (July 2–5).
 5 – Mathias Eick was recipient of the Kongsberg Jazz Award or DNB.prisen 2014 at the Kongsberg Jazzfestival.
 10 – The Stavernfestivalen started in Stavern (July 10–12).
 14 – Moldejazz started in Molde with Sidsel Endresen as artist in residence (July 14–19).
 15 – Monkey Plot was awarded the JazzIntro 2014.

August
 11 – Oslo Jazzfestival started in Oslo (August 11–16).
 12 – Odd André Elveland was recipient of the Ella-prisen 2014 at the Oslo Jazzfestival.

September
 4 – The Punktfestivalen started in Kristiansand (September 4–6).
 10 – Ultima Oslo Contemporary Music Festival 2014 starts in Oslo (September 10–20).
 17 – Nordic Music Days 2014 started in Oslo (September 17–20), hosted by the Ultima Oslo Contemporary Music Festival for the Norwegian Society of Composers.

October
 17 – The Ekkofestival started in Bergen (October 17–25).
 20 – The Asker Jazz Festival started in Asker (October 20–26).
 23 – The Insomnia Festival started in Tromsø (October 23–26).

November
 12 – The Vardø Blues Festival (Blues i Vintermørket) started (November 12 – 15).
 13 – The 9th Barents Jazz, Tromsø International Jazz Festival started (November 13 – 15).

December
 11 – The Nobel Peace Prize Concert was held at Telenor Arena.

Albums released

January

February

March

April

May

June

July

August

September

October

November

December

Unknown date
#

M
 Switch by Nils Petter Molvær (Okhe).

New Artists
 Emilie Nicolas received the Spellemannprisen award, as 'Best newcomer of the year 2014', for the album Like I’m A Warrior and was with that also recipient of the Gramo grant.
 Monkey Plot was awarded the 2014 JazzIntro at the Moldejazz, July 15, 2014.

Deaths

 January
 6 – Thor Hilmersen, rock guitarist (born 1946).
 15
 Per Eirik Johansen, rock singer and music manager (born 1959)
 Aage Teigen, jazz trombonist (born 1944)

 May
 23 – Per Gunnar Jensen, pop singer (born 1928)

August
 15 – Svein Nymo, traditional folk violinist and composer (born 1953).
 19 – Kåre Kolberg, contemporary classical composer (born 1936).
 23 – Inga Juuso, yoiker, Sami singer, and actress (born 1945).
 29 – Jan Groth, rock singer (Aunt Mary, Just 4 Fun), cancer (born 1946).

October
 10 – Olav Dale, jazz saxophonist, composer, and orchestra leader (born 1958).
 22 – Almar Heggen (81), opera singer (born 1933).

December
 8 – Knut Nystedt, contemporary classical composer (born 1915).
 12 – John Persen, Sami composer (born 1941).

See also
 2014 in Norway
 Music of Norway
 Norway in the Eurovision Song Contest 2014
 Spellemannprisen

References

 
Norwegian music
Norwegian
Music
2010s in Norwegian music